Anders Sæterøy (6 August 1901  –  10 June 1991) was a Norwegian politician for the Labour Party.

He was born in Surnadal.

He was elected to the Norwegian Parliament from Møre og Romsdal in 1954, and was re-elected on three occasions. He had previously served as a deputy representative in the periods 1945–1949 and 1950–1953.

Sæterøy was mayor of Surnadal municipality in the periods 1945–1947, 1947–1951 and 1951–1955.

References

1901 births
1991 deaths
Labour Party (Norway) politicians
Members of the Storting
20th-century Norwegian politicians
People from Surnadal